The 2015 Asian Water Polo Championship was held from 16–20 December 2015 in Foshan, China. It was the Asian continental qualification for the 2016 Olympic water polo tournament.

The draw was held on 21 November 2015 at 12:00. A men's and a women's tournament was held, with the winner qualifying directly for the 2016 Summer Olympics in Rio de Janeiro, Brazil.

Men's tournament

Women's tournament

References

Asian Water Polo Championship
International water polo competitions hosted by China
Asian Water Polo Championship
Asian Water Polo Championship